Dormition Church of Kondopoga was a Russian Orthodox Church in the city of Kondopoga, Kondopozhsky District of the Republic of Karelia. The church was located in the historic part of the city, in the former village of Kondopoga, on the shores of Lake Onega Kondopozhskaya Bay on a promontory jutting into Chupa Bay. Elevation Church was 42 meters. The height of the tent and log towers, two octagons and the quadrangle, and the quadrangular height and width was in the ratio of about 1:2.

Assumption Church was a monument of wooden architecture and Zaonezhskaya branch Kondopozhsky City Museum. During the holidays of the Eastern Orthodox Church services were held, mostly in the summer. Regular services were held in the Church of Candlemas, which was rebuilt by the local architect of the transformer station.

It was destroyed by fire in August 2018.

History
The church was built in 1774 in the style of Russian wooden architecture. Belongs to Prionezhskaya school hip architecture. The church was built in memory of the victims participating Kizhi uprising, which was attended by farmers and township Kondopozhskaya.

According to the Decree of 23 January 1918 "On the separation of church and state" and instruction in 1920 and the People's Commissariat Department of Museums "on its application" all church property "passed into the facilities management department for museums, conservation of works of art and antiquities Commissariat".

In August 1926 the church inspected Onega expedition led by Igor Grabar, which was attended by the architect PD Baranovsky, restorer GO Chirikov, NN Orange and photographer AV Ljadov.

The Church was not rebuilt, but was restored in 1927, in 1950 and in 1999.

In the summer of 1960 the Council of Ministers of the RSFSR placed the church under state protection.

Lost buildings
Near the Assumption Church there were two wooden buildings that disappeared in the Soviet era: the winter Church of the Nativity of the Virgin (1857) and the belfry (18th century).

In the years 1829-1831, next to the Church of the Assumption at the expense of the parishioners had built a wooden tower, and in 1857 - the winter Church of the Nativity of the Virgin. The bell tower was demolished in 1930, and the winter church in 1960.

The Assumption Church was totally destroyed by fire on 10 August 2018. It had been one of the most important landmarks of Kondopoga.

Gallery

References

Churches in the Republic of Karelia
Wooden churches in Russia
Russian Orthodox church buildings in Russia
1774 establishments in the Russian Empire
Burned buildings and structures
Cultural heritage monuments in the Republic of Karelia
Objects of cultural heritage of Russia of federal significance